The 1990 Vuelta a Murcia was the sixth edition of the Vuelta a Murcia cycle race and was held on 6 March to 11 March 1990. The race started in Águilas and finished in Murcia. The race was won by Tom Cordes.

General classification

References

1990
1990 in road cycling
1990 in Spanish sport